Dance of Love is the tenth studio album by Canadian musician Dan Hill, released in 1991. Its two singles, "I Fall All Over Again" and "Hold Me Now" were both top 30 hits on the U.S. Billboard Adult Contemporary chart, peaking at numbers 7 and 30, respectively.

Track listing

Personnel 
 Dan Hill – lead and backing vocals, BGV arrangements (3)
 Charles Judge – keyboards (1, 3, 6, 11), drum programming (3, 6, 11), bass programming (11)
 Doug James – keyboards (2, 4, 5, 7, 8, 12), drum programming (2, 4, 5, 8, 12), string arrangements (4, 7), acoustic piano (8), bass (8, 12)
 John Sheard – keyboards (2, 5, 9, 12), string arrangements (2, 5, 8, 9), BGV arrangements (3, 4), backing vocals (4), organ (8), horns (8), bass (9, 12), drum programming (9)
 Claude Gaudette – keyboards (10)
 Rick Haun – keyboards (10), drum programming (10), arrangements (10)
 Tony Smith – programming (10)
 Ron Kormie – guitars (1, 3)
 Michael Landau – guitars (2, 4, 7)
 Rob Piltch – guitars (2, 5)
 Chas Sandford – acoustic guitar (6), electric guitar (6), "Cyclorama" guitar (6)
 Asher Horowitz – guitars (8)
 Chris Yost – guitars (9)
 Dean Parks – acoustic guitar (10)
 Michael Thompson – electric guitar (10), guitars (11)
 John Pierce – bass (1, 3)
 Nathan East – bass (2, 4, 7)
 Neil Stubenhaus – bass (5, 10)
 Jerry Watts, Jr. – bass (6)
 Chris Ross – drums (1)
 Kevan McKenzie – additional drums (2, 5)
 Carlos Vega – additional drums (2, 4), drums (7)
 Paulinho da Costa – percussion (10)
 Carol Nathan – string arrangements (4, 7)
 Cherie Camp – backing vocals (4)
 Shirley Eikhard – backing vocals (4)
 Ross Harwood – backing vocals (4)
 John Lowery – backing vocals (4)
 Rique Franks – lead vocals (7)
 Deborah Cox – backing vocals (8)
 Dawn Cumberbund – backing vocals (8)

Production 
 Dan Hill – executive producer 
 Charles Judge – engineer (1, 3)
 Nick Didia – engineer (1), mix assistant (11)
 Rob Jacobs – engineer (1), mixing (1, 3, 11)
 Hugh Cooper – engineer (2, 4, 5, 7, 8, 9, 12)
 Elliot Solomon – engineer (2-5, 7, 11)
 Doug James – engineer (4)
 Chas Sandford – engineer (6), mixing (6)
 Paul Shubat – engineer (8)
 Noel Golden – engineer (9)
 Humberto Gatica – mixing (2, 4, 5, 7, 10), engineer (10)
 Earl Torino – mixing (8, 12)
 Lenny Derose – mixing (9)
 Casey McMackin – assistant engineer (1, 3)
 Mark Spiteri – assistant engineer (5)
 Jeff Robinson – assistant engineer (6)
 Andrew King – assistant engineer (11)
 Dave Lopez – mix assistant (1), assistant engineer (6, 11)
 Alejandro Rodriguez – mix assistant (2, 4, 5, 7), assistant engineer (10)
 Eric Apps – mix assistant (8)
 Paul Seeley – mix assistant (9)
 George Marino – mastering 
 Candy Capek – production coordinator (5, 7)
 Hugh Syme – art direction, design
 Lori Stoll – photography 
 Howard Rosen – manager

Studios
 Mixed at Secret Sound (South Pacific); Ground Control Studios (Santa Monica, California); Ameraycan Studios (North Hollywood, California); Winfield Sound (Weston, Ontario); Maclear Studios.
 Mastered at Sterling Sound (New York City, New York).

References

1991 albums
Dan Hill albums
Quality Records albums